Stansted Mountfitchet railway station is on the West Anglia Main Line serving the village of Stansted Mountfitchet in Essex, England. Its three-letter station code is SST.

The station and all trains serving it are operated by Greater Anglia.

The station, which was opened by the Eastern Counties Railway in 1845, was originally known simply as Stansted. It was renamed to its current name in 1990 to avoid potential confusion with the forthcoming station at Stansted Airport, although a local resident, Joseph J. Green, had requested such a name change as early as 1890.

The station building is the original from 1845.

The station features a ticket office and passenger information screens as well as the 'flip clock' from the Network Southeast period on the London bound platform. Both platforms were extended to accommodate 12-coach trains in 2011.

Services
All services at Stansted Mountfitchet are operated by Greater Anglia (including some services which operate under the Stansted Express brand). Services are operated using  and  EMUs.

The typical off-peak service in trains per hour is:
 2 tph to London Liverpool Street
 1 tph to 
 1 tph to 

During the peak hours, the station is served by an additional hourly service between London Liverpool Street and Cambridge North.

In popular culture
The station appeared in the episode "Judgement of Solomon" of the 1990s TV drama Lovejoy.

References

External links

Railway stations in Essex
DfT Category E stations
Former Great Eastern Railway stations
Railway stations in Great Britain opened in 1845
Greater Anglia franchise railway stations
Stansted Mountfitchet